Nida Landscape Park (Nadnidziański Park Krajobrazowy) is a Polish Landscape Park designated protected area, located in Świętokrzyskie Voivodeship of south-central Poland. Within the Solec Basin, gypsum outcrops are common, forming rocky cliffs. Examples of karst formations include numerous caves, ponors, wywierzyski, karst lakes and rock gates. They are found in the vicinity of Gacek, Wiślica and Busk-Zdrój. There are karst gullies in Gorysławice. The karst forms found in Nadnidziański Park are unique in the country.  Among the most valuable are large-crystalline (glassy) gypsums. The crystals of which they are composed reach a length of 3.5 meters.

Geography
It was established in 1986, and is a Natura 2000 EU Special Protection Area.

Within the Landscape Park are ten nature reserves.

Counties and Gminas
The Park lies within Świętokrzyskie Voivodeship, in:
Busko County — Gmina Busko-Zdrój, Gmina Nowy Korczyn, Gmina Wiślica
Jędrzejów County — Gmina Imielno), Kazimierza County (Gmina Opatowiec
Kielce County — Gmina Chmielnik
Pińczów County — Gmina Pińczów, Gmina Kije, Gmina Michałów, Gmina Złota

See also

Special Protection Areas in Poland

References

Nida
Parks in Świętokrzyskie Voivodeship
Natura 2000 in Poland
Busko County
Jędrzejów County
Kielce County
Pińczów County
1986 establishments in Poland
Protected areas established in 1986